The 2009 ADAC 1000 km-Rennen Nürburgring was the fourth round of the 2009 Le Mans Series season. It took place at the Nürburgring GP-Strecke, Nürburg, Germany, on 23 August 2009. Aston Martin Racing, with third entry AMR Eastern Europe, swept the overall podium for this race, led by the No. 007 of Jan Charouz, Tomáš Enge, and Stefan Mücke. Quifel ASM Team led the LMP2 category for the second straight race, while the Larbre Compétition Saleen outlasted its only competition in GT1. The No. 77 Team Felbermayr-Proton Porsche won their third race of the season.

Report

Qualifying

Qualifying result
Pole position winners in each class are marked in bold.

Race

Race results
Class winners in bold.  Cars failing to complete 70% of winner's distance marked as Not Classified (NC).

References

External links
 Le Mans Series - 1000 km du Nürburgring

Nurburgring
6 Hours of Nürburgring
1000